Stiphodon carisa, the Lampung hill-stream goby is a species of goby found on Sumatra, Indonesia.  
This species can reach a length of  SL.

References

carisa
Taxa named by Ronald E. Watson
Fish described in 2008